Timothy Eneas (born 25 October 1972) is a Bahamian swimmer. He competed in two events at the 1992 Summer Olympics.

References

External links
 

1972 births
Living people
Bahamian male swimmers
Olympic swimmers of the Bahamas
Swimmers at the 1992 Summer Olympics
Place of birth missing (living people)